Special Boat Squadron can refer to:

 Special Boat Service, known as the Special Boat Squadron 1977-1987 (British Royal Navy)
 Special Boat Squadron (Sri Lanka), a special forces unit of the Sri Lanka Navy modelled after the British Special Boat Service

See also
Special boat unit (disambiguation)